Pasquale Orsini (born 1970) is an Italian palaeographer, librarian, and Professor from Università di Catania-Siracusa.

Life 

Orsini studied at the Sapienza University of Rome. He was a pupil of prof. Guglielmo Cavallo. He works at the Università di Catania-Siracusa. In 2004 he became a member of the Associazione Italiana Manoscritti Datati.

He examined and described Uncial 059, 082, 0321, and manuscripts housed in the Biblioteca Malatestiana, in Cesena.

Works 
 Manoscritti in maiuscola biblica. Materiali per un aggiornamento, Cassino, Edizioni dell'Università degli Studi di Cassino, 2005 (Collana scientifica, Studi Archeologici, Artistici, Filologici, Letterari e Storici, 7).
 Pasquale Orsini, P. Radiciotti, I frammenti della Qubbat al-khazna di Damasco. A proposito di una scoperta sottovalutata, "Nea Rhome" 5 (2008), pp. 45–74.

References

External links 
 Pasquale Orsini AIPD
 Pasquale Orsini

1970 births
Italian palaeographers
Living people